Samuel Nicholson Kingdon (16 May 1805 – 17 March 1872) was an English cricketer with amateur status. He was associated with Cambridge University and made his first-class debut in 1827.

He was educated at Eton College and at Trinity College, Cambridge. He later became a fellow of Sidney Sussex College, Cambridge and was vicar of Bridgerule, where his father had also been vicar, from 1844 to his death in 1872.

References

1806 births
1843 deaths
English cricketers
English cricketers of 1826 to 1863
Cambridge University cricketers
People educated at Eton College
Alumni of Trinity College, Cambridge
19th-century English Anglican priests